Parexarnis photophila is a moth of the family Noctuidae. It is found on the Canary Islands (La Gomera, Tenerife and Fuerteventura) and in Morocco, Algeria and the southern tip of Spain.

The wingspan is 45–55 mm. Adults are on wing from April to July depending.

Description from Seitz
R. photophila Guen. (=ignipeta Oberth.) (13c). Differs from the W. Asiatic sollers, to which it is otherwise closely allied, by the wholly white and markless underside, and by the paler hindwings. Algeria, C. Bon.

References

External links
Actebia (Parexarnis) photophila (Guenée, 1852)- a noctuid species new to mainland Spain and Europe- and records of Cydia blackmoreana (Walsingham,1903) - a micro-moth also new to Spain(Lepidoptera: Noctuidae, Tortricidae)

Noctuinae